The Grampians Rail Trail is a walking and cycling rail trail in Victoria, Australia.

The trail runs  from Heatherlie Quarry, in the Grampians, to Stawell, in Victoria's west. As of November 2014, about 11 kilometres of trail is open. A very short section of trail is also open at the Heatherlie Quarry end. There are no plans to connect the two.

References 

Rail trails in Victoria (Australia)